Dina Meyer (born December 22, 1968) is an American actress. She began her career appearing in a recurring role on the Fox teen drama series Beverly Hills, 90210 (1993–94), before landing a leading role opposite Keanu Reeves in the 1995 film Johnny Mnemonic.

Meyer has acted in a number of roles in films Dragonheart (1996), Starship Troopers (1997), Bats (1999), D-Tox (2002), and Star Trek: Nemesis (2002). She played Detective Allison Kerry in the Saw film franchise. On television, Meyer starred as Barbara Gordon/Oracle/Batgirl in the short-lived series Birds of Prey (2002–03) and was regular on Secret Agent Man (2000) and Point Pleasant (2005).

Early life
Meyer was born in Queens, New York. In 1991, she graduated from Long Island University in Brookville, New York with a bachelor of business administration degree. She trained in acting for three years at the Neighborhood Playhouse School of the Theatre in New York. She is Jewish.

Career
Meyer moved to Los Angeles in 1993 to appear in the Fox teen drama series Beverly Hills, 90210 in the recurring role of Lucinda Nicholson. Shortly afterwards, she was cast as the female lead in the action film Johnny Mnemonic opposite Keanu Reeves. The following year, she appeared in the fantasy film Dragonheart directed by Rob Cohen. In early 1997, Meyer had a recurring role as Kate Miller in the NBC sitcom Friends. Later that year, she went to appear alongside Casper Van Dien in the science-fiction film Starship Troopers directed by Paul Verhoeven. The film underperformed at box office. The following year, she starred alongside James Caan in the neo-noir film Poodle Springs, which was released on HBO. In 1999, she starred in the horror film Bats; the film was a moderate box-office success. In 2002, she appeared opposite Sylvester Stallone in the thriller film D-Tox. Also in 2002, Meyer appeared as Romulan Commander Donatra in the science-fiction film Star Trek: Nemesis.

In 2000, Meyer starred in the UPN spy drama series Secret Agent Man, which was cancelled after one season. From 2002 to 2003, she starred as Barbara Gordon/Oracle/Batgirl in the short-lived The WB superhero series Birds of Prey. She reprised this role in 2019, on the CW series The Flash during "Crisis on Infinite Earths" crossover. In 2003, she had a recurring role in the Fox comedy-drama Miss Match, and in 2005 was regular cast member in the Fox primetime soap opera, Point Pleasant. Meyer also played the leading roles in the Lifetime television movies Deception (2004), Crimes of Passion (2005), His and Her Christmas (2005), The Boy Next Door (2008), and Web of Desire (2009).

In 2004, Meyer played Detective Allison Kerry in the horror film Saw. She reprised her role in Saw II (2005),  Saw III (2006), and Saw IV (2007). She later starred in a number of straight-to-video horror films, include Crazy Eights (2006) and Decoys 2: Alien Seduction (2007). She appeared in the 2010 horror-comedy film Piranha 3D and 2017 horror film The Evil Within. In 2013, Meyer appeared in the Western film Dead in Tombstone opposite Mickey Rourke. Meyer also played the leading roles in two more Lifetime Movie Network films, Lethal Seduction (2015), as a sexy, psychotic woman determined to get her man, and Flight 192 (2016), playing an FBI agent who is caught in a dilemma when she learns shortly after boarding a flight to Washington, DC, that her husband and son have been taken hostage.

Meyer has made several guest appearances on television series, including Ally McBeal, Six Feet Under, Nip/Tuck, The Mentalist, Castle, NCIS, CSI: Crime Scene Investigation, and American Horror Story. She had a recurring roles ABC comedy-drama Scoundrels in 2010, and on The CW teen drama 90210 from 2011 to 2012. In 2014, she starred opposite Patrick Warburton and Jesse Bradford in the Crackle series Sequestered. In 2018, she had a recurring roles on SyFy fantasy series The Magicians, as in the fourth season of Showtime's critically acclaimed drama, The Affair. In 2019, she began appearing in a recurring role in the CW sports drama All American as Gwen Adams, Asher's (played by Cody Christian) mother.

Filmography

Film

Television

Video games

References

External links

 
 
 
 

1968 births
Living people
Actresses from New York City
American film actresses
American television actresses
Long Island University alumni
People from Queens, New York
20th-century American actresses
21st-century American actresses